Chak No.42 Gop-e-Rah is a small village located in Kasur District, Punjab, Pakistan.

Gop-e-Rah chak 42 is a small village at a distance of almost 8 kilometers from Pattoki Tehsil, (District Kasur) in Pakistan. As, land of this village is very fertile, so, most of the people from this village are related to agriculture. Population of Gop-e-rah is approximately 300 persons. Many young people have moved to cities for better education and better career opportunities and are no more doing agricultural work.

People of Gop-e-Rah are Muslims. Main tribes are Ghumman, Cheema, Mangan, Sial, Gill, and others.

Populated places in Kasur District